Keat Hwa II Secondary School was founded in 2004 after Keat Hwa I Secondary School, which was founded in 1970. Before 1970, it was located at Kampung Baru, Alor Star, Kedah, Malaysia and shared facilities with another branch of the Keat Hwa schools, a primary school named Keat Hwa (S). After five decades, the school got approval to build its own facilities, which are located at Taman Sri Abadi, off Kuala Kedah Road, 06600 Alor Star, Kedah. Since moving to its new location, enrolment in the school has doubled.

The new school ground has six science labs, one block dedicated to the living skills subject, and a library. Since 2003, science and mathematics have been taught in English. Before that, the subjects were taught in Malay, the native language of Malaysia.

See also
 Keat Hwa Centennial Celebrations
 Keat Hwa Secondary School
 Keat Hwa High School

2004 establishments in Malaysia
Chinese-language schools in Malaysia

Alor Setar
Keat Hwa Education Group
Secondary schools in Malaysia
Schools in Kedah
Educational institutions established in 2004